

Events

Pre-1600
215 BC – A temple is built on the Capitoline Hill dedicated to Venus Erycina to commemorate the Roman defeat at Lake Trasimene.
599 – Maya king Uneh Chan of Calakmul attacks rival city-state Palenque in southern Mexico, defeating queen Yohl Ik'nal and sacking the city.
711 – Dagobert III succeeds his father King Childebert III as King of the Franks.
1014 – Battle of Clontarf: High King of Ireland Brian Boru defeats Viking invaders, but is killed in battle.
1016 – Edmund Ironside succeeds his father Æthelred the Unready as King of England.
1343 – St. George's Night Uprising commences in the Duchy of Estonia.
1348 – The founding of the Order of the Garter by King Edward III is announced on St. George's Day.
1500 – Portuguese explorer Pedro Alvarez Cabral reaches new coastline (Brazil). 
1516 – The Munich Reinheitsgebot (regarding the ingredients of beer) takes effect in all of Bavaria.
1521 – Battle of Villalar: King Charles I of Spain defeats the Comuneros.

1601–1900
1635 – The first public school in the United States, Boston Latin School, is founded in Boston.
1655 – The Siege of Santo Domingo begins during the Anglo-Spanish War, and fails seven days later.
1660 – Treaty of Oliva is established between Sweden and Poland.
1661 – King Charles II of England, Scotland and Ireland is crowned in Westminster Abbey.
1815 – The Second Serbian Uprising: A second phase of the national revolution of the Serbs against the Ottoman Empire, erupts shortly after the annexation of the country to the Ottoman Empire.
1879 – Fire burns down the second main building and dome of the University of Notre Dame, which prompts the construction of the third, and current, Main Building with its golden dome.
1891 – Chilean Civil War: The ironclad Blanco Encalada is sunk at Caldera Bay by torpedo boats.

1901–present
1914 – First baseball game at Wrigley Field, then known as Weeghman Park, in Chicago. 
1918 – World War I: The British Royal Navy makes a raid in an attempt to neutralise the Belgian port of Bruges-Zeebrugge.
1919 – The Estonian Constituent Assembly was held in Estonia, which marked the birth of the Estonian Parliament, the Riigikogu.
1920 – The Grand National Assembly of Turkey (TBMM) is founded in Ankara. The assembly denounces the government of Sultan Mehmed VI and announces the preparation of a temporary constitution.
1927 – Cardiff City defeat Arsenal in the FA Cup Final, the only time it has been won by a team not based in England.
1935 – The Polish Constitution of 1935 is adopted.
1940 – The Rhythm Club fire at a dance hall in Natchez, Mississippi, kills 198 people.
1941 – World War II: The Greek government and King George II evacuate Athens before the invading Wehrmacht.
1942 – World War II: Baedeker Blitz: German bombers hit Exeter, Bath and York in retaliation for the British raid on Lübeck.
1945 – World War II: Adolf Hitler's designated successor, Hermann Göring, sends him a telegram asking permission to take leadership of Nazi Germany. Martin Bormann and Joseph Goebbels advise Hitler that the telegram is treasonous.
1946 – Manuel Roxas is elected the last President of the Commonwealth of the Philippines.
1949 – Chinese Civil War: Establishment of the People's Liberation Army Navy.
1951 – Cold War: American journalist William N. Oatis is arrested for espionage by the Communist government of Czechoslovakia.
1961 – Algiers putsch by French generals.
1967 – Soviet space program: Soyuz 1 (Russian: Союз 1, Union 1) a crewed spaceflight carrying cosmonaut Colonel Vladimir Komarov is launched into orbit.
1968 – Vietnam War: Student protesters at Columbia University in New York City take over administration buildings and shut down the university.
1971 – Bangladesh Liberation War: The Pakistan Army and Razakars massacre approximately 3,000 Hindu emigrants in the Jathibhanga area of East Pakistan (now Bangladesh).
1985 – Coca-Cola changes its formula and releases New Coke. The response is overwhelmingly negative, and the original formula is back on the market in less than three months.
1990 – Namibia becomes the 160th member of the United Nations and the 50th member of the Commonwealth of Nations.
1993 – Eritreans vote overwhelmingly for independence from Ethiopia in a United Nations-monitored referendum.
  1993   – Sri Lankan politician Lalith Athulathmudali is assassinated while addressing a gathering, approximately four weeks ahead of the Provincial Council elections for the Western Province.
1999 – NATO bombs the headquarters of Radio Television of Serbia, as part of their aerial campaign against the Federal Republic of Yugoslavia.
2005 – The first YouTube video, titled "Me at the zoo", was published by co-founder Jawed Karim.
2013 – At least 28 people are killed and more than 70 are injured as violence breaks out in Hawija, Iraq.
2018 – A vehicle-ramming attack kills 10 people and injures 16 in Toronto. A 25-year-old suspect, Alek Minassian, is arrested.
2019 –  The April 2019 Hpakant jade mine collapse in Myanmar kills four miners and two rescuers.

Births

Pre-1600
1141 (probable) – Malcolm IV of Scotland (d. 1165)
1185 – Afonso II of Portugal (d. 1223)
1408 – John de Vere, 12th Earl of Oxford (d. 1462)
1420 – George of Poděbrady, King of Bohemia (d. 1471)
1464 – Joan of France, Duchess of Berry (d. 1505)
  1464   – Robert Fayrfax, English Renaissance composer (d. 1521)
1484 – Julius Caesar Scaliger, Italian physician and scholar (d. 1558)
1500 – Alexander Ales, Scottish theologian and academic (d. 1565)
  1500   – Johann Stumpf, Swiss writer (d. 1576)
1512 – Henry FitzAlan, 19th Earl of Arundel, Chancellor of the University of Oxford (d. 1580)
1516 – Georg Fabricius, German poet, historian, and archaeologist (d. 1571)
1598 – Maarten Tromp, Dutch admiral (d. 1653)

1601–1900
1621 – William Penn, English admiral and politician (d. 1670)
1628 – Johannes Hudde, Dutch mathematician and politician (d. 1704)
1661 – Issachar Berend Lehmann, German-Jewish banker, merchant and diplomat (d. 1730)
1715 – Johann Friedrich Doles, German composer and conductor (d. 1797)
1720 – Vilna Gaon, Lithuanian rabbi and author (d. 1797)
1744 – Princess Charlotte Amalie Wilhelmine of Schleswig-Holstein-Sonderburg-Plön (d. 1770)
1748 – Félix Vicq-d'Azyr, French physician and anatomist (d. 1794)
1791 – James Buchanan, American soldier, lawyer, and politician, 15th President of the United States (d. 1868)
1792 – Thomas Romney Robinson, Irish astronomer and physicist (d. 1882)
1794 – Wei Yuan, Chinese scholar and author (d. 1856)
1805 – Johann Karl Friedrich Rosenkranz, German philosopher and academic (d. 1879)
1812 – Frederick Whitaker, English-New Zealand lawyer and politician, 5th Prime Minister of New Zealand (d. 1891)
1813 – Stephen A. Douglas, American educator and politician, 7th Illinois Secretary of State (d. 1861)
  1813   – Frédéric Ozanam, Italian-French historian and scholar (d. 1853)
1818 – James Anthony Froude, English historian, novelist, biographer and editor (d. 1894)
1819 – Edward Stafford, Scottish-New Zealand educator and politician, 3rd Prime Minister of New Zealand (d. 1901)
1853 – Winthrop M. Crane, American businessman and politician, 40th Governor of Massachusetts (d. 1920)
1856 – Granville Woods, American inventor and engineer (d. 1910)
1857 – Ruggero Leoncavallo, Italian composer (d. 1919)
1858 – Max Planck, German physicist and academic, Nobel Prize laureate (d. 1947)
1860 – Justinian Oxenham, Australian public servant (d. 1932)
1861 – Edmund Allenby, 1st Viscount Allenby, English field marshal and diplomat, British High Commissioner in Egypt (d. 1936)
  1861   – John Peltz, American baseball player and manager (d. 1906)
1865 – Ali-Agha Shikhlinski, Russian-Azerbaijani general (d. 1943)
1867 – Johannes Fibiger, Danish physician and pathologist, Nobel Prize laureate (d. 1928)
1876 – Arthur Moeller van den Bruck, German historian and author (d. 1925)
1880 – Michel Fokine, Russian dancer and choreographer (d. 1942)
1882 – Albert Coates, English composer and conductor (d. 1953)
1888 – Georges Vanier, Canadian general and politician, 19th Governor General of Canada (d. 1967)
1889 – Karel Doorman, Dutch admiral (d. 1942)
1893 – Frank Borzage, American actor and director (d. 1952)
1895 – Ngaio Marsh, New Zealand author and director (d. 1982)
1897 – Folke Jansson, American general (d. 1965)
  1897   – Lester B. Pearson, Canadian historian and politician, 14th Prime Minister of Canada, Nobel Prize laureate (d. 1972)
1898 – Lucius D. Clay, American general (d. 1978)
1899 – Bertil Ohlin, Swedish economist and politician, Nobel Prize laureate (d. 1979)
  1899   – Minoru Shirota, Japanese physician and microbiologist, invented Yakult (d. 1982)
1900 – Jim Bottomley, American baseball player and sportscaster (d. 1959)
  1900   – Joseph Green, Polish-American actor and director (d. 1996)

1901–present
1901 – E. B. Ford, English biologist and geneticist (d. 1988)
1902 – Halldór Laxness, Icelandic author and poet, Nobel Prize laureate (d. 1998)
1903 – Guy Simonds, English-Canadian general (d. 1974)
1904 – Clifford Bricker, Canadian long-distance runner (d. 1980)
  1904   – Louis Muhlstock, Polish-Canadian painter (d. 2001)
  1904   – Duncan Renaldo, American actor (d. 1985)
1907 – Lee Miller, American model and photographer (d. 1977)
  1907   – Fritz Wotruba, Austrian sculptor, designed the Wotruba Church (d. 1975)
1908 – Myron Waldman, American animator and director (d. 2006)
1910 – Sheila Scott Macintyre, Scottish mathematician (d. 1960)
  1910   – Simone Simon, French actress (d. 2005)
1911 – Ronald Neame, English-American director, cinematographer, producer, and screenwriter (d. 2010)
1913 – Diosa Costello, Puerto Rican-American entertainer, producer and club owner (d. 2013)
1915 – Arnold Alexander Hall, English engineer, academic, and businessman (d. 2000)
1916 – Yiannis Moralis, Greek painter and educator (d. 2009)
  1916   – Sinah Estelle Kelley, American chemist (d. 1982)
1917 – Dorian Leigh, American model (d. 2008)
  1917   – Tony Lupien, American baseball player and coach (d. 2004)
1918 – Maurice Druon, French author and screenwriter (d. 2009)
1919 – Oleg Penkovsky, Russian colonel (d. 1963)
1920 – Eric Grant Yarrow, 3rd Baronet, English businessman (d. 2018)
1921 – Judy Agnew, Second Lady of the United States (d. 2012)
  1921   – Cleto Bellucci, Italian archbishop (d. 2013)
  1921   – Janet Blair, American actress and singer (d. 2007)
  1921   – Warren Spahn, American baseball player and coach (d. 2003)
1923 – Dolph Briscoe, American lieutenant and politician, 41st Governor of Texas (d. 2010)
  1923   – Avram Davidson, American soldier and author (d. 1993)
1924 – Chuck Harmon, American baseball player and scout (d. 2019)
  1924   – Bobby Rosengarden, American drummer and bandleader (d. 2007)
1926 – J.P. Donleavy, American-Irish novelist and playwright (d. 2017)
  1926   – Rifaat el-Mahgoub, Egyptian politician (d. 1990)
1928 – Shirley Temple, American actress, singer, dancer, and diplomat (d. 2014)
1929 – George Steiner, French-American philosopher, author, and critic (d. 2020)
1932 – Halston, American fashion designer (d. 1990)
  1932   – Jim Fixx, American runner and author (d. 1984)
1933 – Annie Easley, American computer scientist, mathematician, and engineer (d. 2011)
1934 – George Canseco, Filipino composer and producer (d. 2004)
1936 – Roy Orbison, American singer-songwriter (d. 1988)
1937 – Victoria Glendinning, English author and critic
  1937   – David Mills, English cricketer (d. 2013)
  1937   – Barry Shepherd, Australian cricketer (d. 2001)
1939 – Jorge Fons, Mexican director and screenwriter
  1939   – Bill Hagerty, English journalist
  1939   – Lee Majors, American actor
  1939   – Ray Peterson, American pop singer (d. 2005)
1940 – Michael Copps, American academic and politician
  1940   – Dale Houston, American singer-songwriter (d. 2007)
  1940   – Michael Kadosh, Israeli footballer and manager (d. 2014)
1941 – Jacqueline Boyer, French singer and actress
  1941   – Arie den Hartog, Dutch road bicycle racer (d. 2018)
  1941   – Paavo Lipponen, Finnish journalist and politician, 38th Prime Minister of Finland
  1941   – Michael Lynne, American film producer, co-founded New Line Cinema
  1941   – Ed Stewart, English radio and television host (d. 2016)
  1941   – Ray Tomlinson, American computer programmer and engineer (d. 2016)
1942 – Sandra Dee, American model and actress (d. 2005)
1943 – Gail Goodrich, American basketball player and coach
  1943   – Tony Esposito, Canadian-American ice hockey player, coach, and manager (d. 2021)
  1943   – Frans Koppelaar, Dutch painter
  1943   – Hervé Villechaize, French actor (d. 1993)
1944 – Jean-François Stévenin, French actor and director (d. 2021)
1946 – Blair Brown, American actress
  1946   – Carlton Sherwood, American soldier and journalist (d. 2014)
1947 – Robert Burgess, English sociologist and academic
  1947   – Glenn Cornick, English bass player (d. 2014)
  1947   – Bernadette Devlin McAliskey, Irish civil rights leader and politician
1948 – Pascal Quignard, French author and screenwriter
  1948   – Serge Thériault, Canadian actor
1949 – Paul Collier, English economist and academic
  1949   – David Cross, English violinist 
  1949   – John Miles, British rock singer, songwriter, and guitarist 
1950 – Rowley Leigh, English chef and journalist
  1950   – Barbara McIlvaine Smith, Sac and Fox Nation Native American politician
1951 – Martin Bayerle, American treasure hunter
1952 – Narada Michael Walden, American singer-songwriter, drummer, and producer
1953 – James Russo, American actor, director, producer, and screenwriter
1954 – Stephen Dalton, English air marshal
  1954   – Michael Moore, American director, producer, and activist
1955 – Judy Davis, Australian actress
  1955   – Tony Miles, English chess player (d. 2001)
  1955   – Urmas Ott, Estonian journalist and author (d. 2008)
1957 – Neville Brody, English graphic designer, typographer, and art director
  1957   – Jan Hooks, American actress and comedian (d. 2014)
1958 – Hilmar Örn Hilmarsson, Icelandic composer and producer
  1958   – Ryan Walter, Canadian ice hockey player and coach
1959 – Unity Dow, Botswanan judge, author, and rights activist
1960 – Valerie Bertinelli, American actress
  1960   – Steve Clark, English guitarist and songwriter (d. 1991)
  1960   – Barry Douglas, Irish pianist and conductor
  1960   – Léo Jaime, Brazilian singer-songwriter, guitarist, and actor 
  1960   – Claude Julien, Canadian ice hockey player and coach
1961 – George Lopez, American comedian, actor, and talk show host
  1961   – Pierluigi Martini, Italian race car driver
1962 – John Hannah, Scottish actor and producer
  1962   – Shaun Spiers, English businessman and politician
1963 – Paul Belmondo, French race car driver
  1963   – Robby Naish, American windsurfer
1964 – Gianandrea Noseda, Italian pianist and conductor
1965 – Leni Robredo, Filipina human rights lawyer, 14th Vice President of the Philippines
1966 – Jörg Deisinger, German bass player 
  1966   – Matt Freeman, American bass player
  1966   – Lembit Oll, Estonian chess Grandmaster (d. 1999)
1967 – Rhéal Cormier, Canadian baseball player (d. 2021)
  1967   – Melina Kanakaredes, American actress
1968 – Bas Haring, Dutch philosopher, writer, television presenter and professor.
  1968   – Ken McRae, Canadian ice hockey player and coach
  1968   – Timothy McVeigh, American terrorist, Oklahoma City bombing co-perpetrator (d. 2001)
1969 – Martín López-Zubero, American-Spanish swimmer and coach
  1969   – Yelena Shushunova, Russian gymnast
1970 – Egemen Bağış, Turkish politician, 1st Minister of European Union Affairs
  1970   – Dennis Culp, American singer-songwriter and trombonist 
  1970   – Andrew Gee, Australian rugby league player and manager
  1970   – Hans Välimäki, Finnish chef and author
  1970   – Tayfur Havutçu, Turkish international footballer and manager
1971 – Uli Herzner, German-American fashion designer
1972 – Pierre Labrie, Canadian poet and playwright
  1972   – Peter Dench, English photographer and journalist
  1972   – Amira Medunjanin, Bosnian singer 
1973 – Patrick Poulin, Canadian ice hockey player
1974 – Carlos Dengler, American bass player 
  1974   – Michael Kerr, New Zealand-German rugby player
1975 – Bobby Shaw, American football player
1976 – Gabriel Damon, American actor
1976 – Aaron Dessner, American guitarist, songwriter, and producer 
1977 – John Cena, American professional wrestler and actor
  1977   – Andruw Jones, Curaçaoan baseball player
  1977   – David Kidwell, New Zealand rugby league player and coach
  1977   – Willie Mitchell, Canadian ice hockey player
  1977   – John Oliver, English comedian, actor, producer, and screenwriter
  1977   – Kal Penn, Indian-American actor 
  1977   – Bram Schmitz, Dutch cyclist
  1977   – Lee Young-pyo, South Korean international footballer
1978 – Gezahegne Abera, Ethiopian runner
1979 – Barry Hawkins, English snooker player
  1979   – Jaime King, American actress and model
  1979   – Joanna Krupa, Polish-American model and television personality 
  1979   – Samppa Lajunen, Finnish skier
1980 – Nicole den Dulk, Dutch Paralympic equestrian
1982 – Kyle Beckerman, American footballer
  1982   – Tony Sunshine, American singer-songwriter
1983 – Leon Andreasen, Danish international footballer
  1983   – Daniela Hantuchová, Slovak tennis player
  1983   – Ian Henderson, English rugby league player
1984 – Alexandra Kosteniuk, Russian chess player
  1984   – Jesse Lee Soffer, American actor
1985 – Angel Locsin, Filipino actress, producer, and fashion designer
1986 – Sven Kramer, Dutch speed skater
  1986   – Alysia Montaño, American runner
  1986   – Rafael Fernandes, Brazilian baseball player
1987 – Michael Arroyo, Ecuadorian footballer
  1987   – John Boye, Ghanaian footballer
  1987   – Emily Fox, American basketball player 
1988 – Victor Anichebe, Nigerian footballer
  1988   – Alistair Brownlee, English triathlete
  1988   – Signe Ronka, Canadian figure skater 
  1988   – Lenka Wienerová, Slovak tennis player
1989 – Nicole Vaidišová, Czech tennis player
1990 – Rui Fonte, Portuguese footballer
  1990   – Dev Patel, English actor
1991 – Nathan Baker, English footballer
  1991   – Caleb Johnson, American singer-songwriter
  1991   – Paul Vaughan, Australian-Italian rugby league player
1994 – Patrick Olsen, Danish footballer
  1994   – Song Kang, South Korean actor
1995 – Gigi Hadid, American fashion model and television personality
1996 – Carolina Alves, Brazilian tennis player
1997 – Zach Apple, American swimmer
1999 – Son Chaeyoung, South Korean rapper and singer-songwriter
2018 – Prince Louis, member of the British royal family

Deaths

Pre-1600
AD 303 – Saint George, Roman soldier and martyr
711 – Childebert III, Frankish king (b. 670)
 725 – Wihtred of Kent (b. 670)
 871 – Æthelred of Wessex (b. 837)
 915 – Yang Shihou, Chinese general
 944 – Wichmann the Elder, Saxon nobleman
 990 – Ekkehard II, Swiss monk and abbot
 997 – Adalbert of Prague, Czech bishop, missionary, and saint (b. 956)
1014 – Brian Boru, Irish king (b. 941)
1014 – Domnall mac Eimín, Mormaer of Mar
1016 – Æthelred the Unready, English son of Edgar the Peaceful (b. 968)
1124 – Alexander I of Scotland (b. 1078)
1151 – Adeliza of Louvain (b. 1103)
1170 – Minamoto no Tametomo, Japanese samurai (b. 1139)
1196 – Béla III of Hungary (b. c.1148)
1200 – Zhu Xi, Chinese philosopher (b. 1130)
1217 – Inge II of Norway (b. 1185)
1262 – Aegidius of Assisi, companion of Saint Francis of Assisi
1307 – Joan of Acre (b. 1272)
1400 – Aubrey de Vere, 10th Earl of Oxford, English politician and nobleman (b. c. 1338)
1407 – Olivier de Clisson, French soldier (b. 1326)
1501 – Domenico della Rovere, Catholic cardinal (b. 1442)
1554 – Gaspara Stampa, Italian poet (b. 1523)

1601–1900
1605 – Boris Godunov, Russian ruler (b. 1551)
1616 – William Shakespeare, English playwright and poet (b. 1564)

1625 – Maurice, Prince of Orange (b. 1567)
1695 – Henry Vaughan, Welsh poet and author (b. 1621)
1702 – Margaret Fell, English religious leader, founded the Religious Society of Friends (b. 1614)
1781 – James Abercrombie, Scottish general and politician (b. 1706)
1784 – Solomon I of Imereti (b. 1735)
1792 – Karl Friedrich Bahrdt, German theologian and author (b. 1741)
1794 – Guillaume-Chrétien de Lamoignon de Malesherbes, French lawyer and politician (b. 1721)
1827 – Georgios Karaiskakis, Greek general (b. 1780)
1839 – Jacques Félix Emmanuel Hamelin, French admiral and explorer (b. 1768)
1850 – William Wordsworth, English poet and author (b. 1770)
1865 – Silas Soule, American soldier and whistleblower of the Sand Creek Massacre (b. 1838)
1889 – Jules Amédée Barbey d'Aurevilly, French author and critic (b. 1808)
1895 – Carl Ludwig, German physician and physiologist (b. 1815)

1901–present
1905 – Gédéon Ouimet, Canadian politician, 2nd Premier of Quebec (b. 1823)
1907 – Alferd Packer, American prospector (b. 1842)
1915 – Rupert Brooke, English poet (b. 1887)
1936 – Teresa de la Parra, French-Venezuelan author (b. 1889)
1951 – Jules Berry, French actor and director (b. 1883)
  1951   – Charles G. Dawes, American banker and politician, 30th Vice President of the United States, Nobel Peace Prize laureate (b. 1865)
1959 – Bak Jungyang, Korean politician 
1965 – George Adamski, Polish-American ufologist and author (b. 1891)
1966 – George Ohsawa, Japanese founder of the Macrobiotic diet (b. 1893)
1981 – Josep Pla, Catalan journalist and author (b. 1897)
1983 – Buster Crabbe, American swimmer and actor (b. 1908)
1984 – Red Garland, American pianist (b. 1923)
1985 – Sam Ervin, American lawyer and politician (b. 1896)
  1985   – Frank Farrell, Australian rugby league player and policeman (b. 1916)
1986 – Harold Arlen, American composer (b. 1905)
  1986   – Jim Laker, English international cricketer and sportscaster; holder of world record for most wickets taken in a match (b. 1922)
  1986   – Otto Preminger, Ukrainian-American actor, director, and producer (b. 1906)
1990 – Paulette Goddard, American actress (b. 1910)
1991 – Johnny Thunders, American singer-songwriter and guitarist (b. 1952)
1992 – Satyajit Ray, Indian director, producer, and screenwriter (b. 1921)
  1992   – Tanka Prasad Acharya, Nepalese politician, 27th Prime Minister of Nepal (b. 1912)
1993 – Cesar Chavez, American activist, co-founded the United Farm Workers (b. 1927)
1995 – Douglas Lloyd Campbell, Canadian farmer and politician, 13th Premier of Manitoba (b. 1895)
  1995   – Howard Cosell, American lawyer and journalist (b. 1918)
  1995   – Riho Lahi, Estonian journalist (b. 1904)
  1995   – John C. Stennis, American lawyer and politician (b. 1904)
1996 – Jean Victor Allard, Canadian general (b. 1913)
  1996   – P. L. Travers, Australian-English author and actress (b. 1899)
1997 – Denis Compton, English cricketer and footballer (b. 1918)
1998 – Konstantinos Karamanlis, Greek lawyer and politician, 172nd Prime Minister of Greece (b. 1907)
  1998   – James Earl Ray, American assassin of Martin Luther King Jr. (b. 1928)
  1998   – Thanassis Skordalos, Greek singer-songwriter and lyra player (b. 1920)
2003 – Fernand Fonssagrives, French-American photographer (b. 1910)
2004 – Herman Veenstra, Dutch water polo player (b. 1911)
2005 – Joh Bjelke-Petersen, New Zealand-Australian politician, 31st Premier of Queensland (b. 1911)
  2005   – Robert Farnon, Canadian-English trumpet player, composer and conductor (b. 1917)
  2005   – Al Grassby, Australian journalist and politician (b. 1928)
  2005   – John Mills, English actor (b. 1908)
  2005   – Romano Scarpa, Italian author and illustrator (b. 1927)
  2005   – Earl Wilson, American baseball player, coach and educator (b. 1934)
  2006   – Phil Walden, American record producer and manager, co-founder of Capricorn Records (b. 1940)
2007 – Paul Erdman, Canadian-American economist and author (b. 1932)
  2007   – David Halberstam, American journalist, historian and author (b. 1934)
  2007   – Peter Randall, English sergeant (b. 1930)
  2007   – Boris Yeltsin, Russian politician, 1st President of Russia (b. 1931)
2010 – Peter Porter, Australian-born British poet (b. 1929) 
2011 – James Casey, English comedian, radio scriptwriter and producer (b. 1922)
  2011   – Tom King, American guitarist and songwriter (b. 1943)
  2011   – Geoffrey Russell, 4th Baron Ampthill, English businessman and politician (b. 1921)
  2011   – Max van der Stoel, Dutch politician and Minister of State (b. 1924)
  2011   – John Sullivan, English screenwriter and producer (b. 1946)
2012 – Lillemor Arvidsson, Swedish trade union leader and politician, 34th Governor of Gotland (b. 1943)
  2012   – Billy Bryans, Canadian drummer, songwriter and producer (b. 1947)
  2012   – Chris Ethridge, American bass player and songwriter (b. 1947)
  2012   – Raymond Thorsteinsson, Canadian geologist and paleontologist (b. 1921)
  2012   – LeRoy T. Walker, American football player and coach (b. 1918)
2013 – Bob Brozman, American guitarist (b. 1954)
  2013   – Robert W. Edgar, American educator and politician (b. 1943)
  2013   – Tony Grealish, English footballer (b. 1956)
  2013   – Antonio Maccanico, Italian banker and politician (b. 1924)
  2013   – Frank W. J. Olver, English-American mathematician and academic (b. 1924)
  2013   – Kathryn Wasserman Davis, American philanthropist and scholar (b. 1907)
2014 – Benjamín Brea, Spanish-Venezuelan saxophonist, clarinet player, and conductor (b. 1946)
  2014   – Michael Glawogger, Austrian director, screenwriter, and cinematographer (b. 1959)
  2014   – Jaap Havekotte, Dutch speed skater and producer of ice skates (b. 1912)
  2014   – Connie Marrero, Cuban baseball player and coach (b. 1911)
  2014   – F. Michael Rogers, American general (b. 1921)
  2014   – Mark Shand, English conservationist and author (b. 1951)
  2014   – Patric Standford, English composer and educator (b. 1939)
2015 – Richard Corliss, American journalist and critic (b. 1944)
  2015   – Ray Jackson, Australian activist (b. 1941)
  2015   – Pierre Claude Nolin, Canadian lawyer and politician, Speaker of the Canadian Senate (b. 1950)
  2015   – Jim Steffen, American football player (b. 1936)
  2015   – Francis Tsai, American author and illustrator (b. 1967)
2016 – Inge King, German-born Australian sculptor (b. 1915)
  2016   – Banharn Silpa-archa, Thai politician, Prime Minister from 1995 to 1996 (b. 1932)
2019 – Charity Sunshine Tillemann-Dick, American soprano singer and presenter (b. 1983)
  2019   – Jean, Grand Duke of Luxembourg (b. 1921)
2021 – Dan Kaminsky, American internet security researcher (b. 1979)
2022 – Orrin Hatch, American politician, President pro tempore of the United States Senate (b. 1934)

Holidays and observances
 Christian feast day:
Adalbert of Prague
Felix, Fortunatus, and Achilleus
George
Blessed Giles of Assisi
Gerard of Toul
Ibar of Beggerin (Meath)
Toyohiko Kagawa (Episcopal and Lutheran Church)
St George's Day (England) and its related observances:
La Diada de Sant Jordi (Catalonia, Spain)
April 23 (Eastern Orthodox liturgics)
Canada Book Day (Canada)
Castile and León Day (Castile and León)
Independence Day (Conch Republic, Key West, Florida)
International Pixel-Stained Technopeasant Day
Khongjom Day (Manipur)
National Sovereignty and Children's Day (Turkey and Northern Cyprus)
Navy Day (China)
World Book Day
UN English Language Day (United Nations)
UN Spanish Language Day (United Nations)

References

Bibliography

External links

 BBC: On This Day
 
 Historical Events on April 23

Days of the year
April